The Pennsylvania Railroad's class O1 comprised eight experimental boxcab electric locomotives built in 1930 and 1931. They were built in preparation for the New York to Washington Electrification project. They had the wheel arrangement classified as 4-4-4 in the Whyte notation (UIC: 2'B2'; AAR: 2-B-2). Although successful, they were not powerful enough for the railroad's increasingly heavy trains.  For production, the PRR chose to concentrate on the P5 class, effectively an enlarged and more powerful version of the O1 with an additional pair of driving wheels.

The eight locomotives were divided into four sub-classes — O1, O1a, O1b, and O1c. Each sub-class was fitted with a different combination of traction motor power output and drive gear ratio. In addition, three O1 locomotives were fitted with General Electric equipment, three with Westinghouse, and two with Brown Boveri. The O1b locomotives used a Buchli drive between the traction motors and the driving wheels.  were used, with two motors geared to each axle.

They were generally employed in pairs by sub-class, generally on short-distance passenger trains between Newark, New Jersey and New York City's Pennsylvania Station.  During World War II they were used on the "Susquehannock" between Harrisburg, Pennsylvania and New York City.  Later in life, they were used for transfer work around Penn Station and Sunnyside Yard, mostly hauling empty passenger stock.  They were all out of service and scrapped by the mid 1960s.

References 

O1
11 kV AC locomotives
4-4-4 locomotives
Experimental locomotives
Passenger locomotives
Electric locomotives of the United States
Standard gauge locomotives of the United States
Scrapped locomotives